Ma Shenglin was a Hui Jahriyya Sufi rebel who fought against the Qing dynasty in the Panthay Rebellion.

In the late 1860s, when Qing loyalist Muslim General Ma Rulong led the reconquest western Yunnan, Ma Shenglin defended town of Greater Donggou against Ma Rulong's army in a battle of in central Yunnan. Ma Shenglin was a Jahriyya order leader in Yunnan and a rebel commander. Mortar fire killed Ma in 1871.

Ma Shenglin was the great uncle of Ma Shaowu, a descendant of Ma Mingxin and a relative of Ma Yuanzhang.

References

19th-century Chinese people
1871 deaths
Hui people
Generals from Yunnan
Naqshbandi order
Chinese Sufis
Year of birth missing